The 2010–11 season was the 105th season in the existence of AJ Auxerre and the club's 31st consecutive season in the top-flight of French football. In addition to the domestic league, Auxerre participated in this season's editions of the Coupe de France, the Coupe de la Ligue and UEFA Champions League.

First-team squad
Squad at end of season

Left club during season

Competitions

Overall record

Ligue 1

League table

Results summary

Results by round

Matches

Coupe de France

Coupe de la Ligue

Champions League

Play-off round

Group stage

Notes and references

Notes

References

AJ Auxerre
AJ Auxerre seasons